Homestead Township is a civil township of Benzie County in the U.S. state of Michigan. The population was 2,329 at the 2020 census. The township is situated in the center of the county. The village of Honor is located within the township on U.S. Highway 31.

Geography

Demographics
As of the census of 2000, there were 2,078 people, 790 households, and 594 families residing in the township. The racial makeup of the township was 94.47% White, 0.24% African American, 2.79% Native American, 0.10% Asian, 0.63% from other races, and 1.78% from two or more races. Hispanic or Latino of any race were 1.40% of the population.

There were 790 households, out of which 33.4% had children under the age of 18 living with them, 61.3% were married couples living together, 9.1% had a female householder with no husband present, and 24.7% were non-families. 19.9% of all households were made up of individuals, and 8.0% had someone living alone who was 65 years of age or older.  The average household size was 2.63 and the average family size was 3.00.

In the township the population was spread out, with 26.2% under the age of 18, 7.0% from 18 to 24, 30.0% from 25 to 44, 25.5% from 45 to 64, and 11.3% who were 65 years of age or older.  The median age was 38 years. For every 100 females, there were 99.8 males.  For every 100 females age 18 and over, there were 96.9 males.

The median income for a household in the township was $35,833, and the median income for a family was $39,107. Males had a median income of $27,321 versus $20,657 for females. The per capita income for the township was $15,387.  About 6.1% of families and 8.0% of the population were below the poverty line, including 10.2% of those under age 18 and 4.7% of those age 65 or over.

References

External links
Homestead Township official website

Townships in Benzie County, Michigan
Traverse City micropolitan area
Townships in Michigan